Sérgio Cláudio dos Santos (born 27 June 1971), better known as Serginho, is a Brazilian former professional footballer who played as a left-back and left winger. Known for his energetic attacking runs down the wing, he won the Champions League twice (in 2003 and 2007), as well as the Serie A title (in 2003–04), among other trophies with A.C. Milan. At international level, he also represented Brazil at the 1999 FIFA Confederations Cup and was part of the team that won the 1999 Copa América. Post retirement, he has acted as manager and agent for former teammate Dida.

Club career
Serginho initially began his professional footballing career in his home country and played for clubs Cruzeiro, Bahia and São Paulo. He moved to Italian side A.C. Milan in 1999, where he was initially a fringe player, starting on the bench but often being the first-choice substitute. The apex of Serginho's Milan career was when he scored a goal and contributed three assists in a 6–0 thrashing of crosstown rivals Inter Milan on 11 May 2001. He also contributed to Milan's 2003 UEFA Champions League victory over Juventus, scoring the first of Milan's three successful penalties in the shootout. The 2005 Champions League Final was a reversal of fortune, however, as Milan surrendered a 3–0 lead at half-time and eventually lost on penalties to Liverpool, with Serginho whistling his shot over the crossbar. Serginho also won the 2003–04 Serie A title and the 2006–07 edition of the UEFA Champions League with Milan, among other trophies.

On 16 May 2008, it was announced that Serginho and compatriot Cafu would be leaving Milan at the end of the 2007–08 season. Serginho also immediately announced his retirement at the end of the season. On 18 May, he played the final minutes of the match against Udinese and appeared quite moved at the end of the game.

International career
Serginho earned ten caps with the Brazilian national team between 1998 and 2001, with his sole goal scored in the 1999 FIFA Confederations Cup Final. He would undoubtedly have won more caps, if not for the ever-present Roberto Carlos as the national team's starting left-back during Serginho's whole career. Internationally, Serginho represented his nation at the 1999 Confederations Cup, where his team won a runners-up medal, and at the 1999 Copa América, winning the latter tournament. He did not make it in Brazil's squad for the 2002 World Cup because of a hamstring injury.

Style of play
Serginho was an incredibly fast and hard-working, offensive-minded player, who could play either as left back or wing back, or even on the left wing. He maintained his extraordinary pace and stamina well into his mid-late 30s. In addition to his speed and energy, he was also known to be an excellent crosser of the ball, and for having a knack for making overlapping runs and getting into good attacking positions, which allowed him to regularly contribute to his team's offence with several assists and even goals. His nickname throughout his career was Il Concorde ("The Concorde"), due to his quick and tireless attacking runs down the left flank of the pitch.

Honours
Bahia
Campeonato Baiano: 1994

São Paulo
Paulista Championship: 1998

A.C. Milan
Serie A: 2003–04
Coppa Italia: 2002–03
Supercoppa Italiana: 2004
UEFA Champions League: 2002–03, 2006–07
UEFA Supercup: 2003
FIFA Club World Cup: 2007
Brazil
Copa América: 1999
FIFA Confederations Cup Silver: 1999
Individual
A.C. Milan Hall of Fame

References

External links

Profile at UEFA.com
Profile at magliarossonera 

1971 births
Living people
People from Nilópolis
Sportspeople from Rio de Janeiro (state)
Brazilian footballers
Association football defenders
Itaperuna Esporte Clube players
Esporte Clube Bahia players
CR Flamengo footballers
Cruzeiro Esporte Clube players
São Paulo FC players
A.C. Milan players
Campeonato Brasileiro Série A players
Serie A players
UEFA Champions League winning players
Brazil international footballers
1999 Copa América players
1999 FIFA Confederations Cup players
Copa América-winning players
Brazilian expatriate footballers
Brazilian expatriate sportspeople in Italy
Expatriate footballers in Italy